Parroquia de San Pedro Apostol may refer to:

 Parroquia de San Pedro Apóstol (Tlaquepaque), Jalisco, Mexico
 Parroquia de San Pedro Apostol (Zapopan), Jalisco, Mexico